Bahman Jahantigh; is an Iranian football striker who plays for Foolad in the Iran Pro League.

Club career

Foolad
He joined Foolad U19 in 2012. After shining in 2013–14 Iranian U19 Premier League where he won top scorer prize with 18 goals he was promoted to first team by Dragan Skočić and signed three-years contract which kept him until 2017 at Foolad. He made his debut for Foolad in the 12th fixture of the 2014–15 Iran Pro League against Zob Ahan as a substitute for Sasan Ansari. On 5 May 2015 he scored his first professional goal in a 1–0 over Lokomotiv Tashkent in the AFC Champions League.

Club career statistics

References

External links
 Bahman Jahantigh at IranLeague.ir

1995 births
Living people
Iranian footballers
Foolad FC players
People from Golestan Province
Iran under-20 international footballers
Association football forwards